In Greek mythology, Hippothous (meaning "swift-riding") is the name of seven men:

 Hippothous, an Egyptian prince as one of the sons of King Aegyptus. He suffered the same fate as his other brothers, save Lynceus, when they were slain on their wedding night by their wives who obeyed the command of their father King Danaus of Libya. Hippothous was the son of Aegyptus by an Arabian woman and thus full brother of Istrus, Chalcodon, Agenor, Chaetus, Diocorystes, Alces, Alcmenor, Euchenor and Hippolytus. In some accounts, he could be a son of Aegyptus either by Eurryroe, daughter of the river-god Nilus, or Isaie, daughter of King Agenor of Tyre. Hippothous married the Danaid Gorge, daughter of Danaus either by the hamadryads Atlanteia or Phoebe.
Hippothous, son of Poseidon and Alope, daughter of Cercyon. He was exposed and suckled by animals, while his mother was executed. After Theseus had killed Cercyon he willingly handed over his kingdom to Hippothous, since both men were the sons of Poseidon. Also known as Hippothoon.
Hippothous, son of Cercyon. He was one of the hunters of the Calydonian Boar. He later inherited the kingdom of Arcadia when king Agapenor did not return from the Trojan War. His successor was his son, Aepytus.
 Hippothous, son of Neaera, daughter of Autolycus. He was killed by Telephus his kinsman (he was the son of Auge).
Hippothous, son of Hippocoon. He was killed, along with father and brothers, by Heracles.
 Hippothous, one of the sons of Priam.
Hippothous, son of Lethus, the son of Teutamides, a descendant of Pelasgus. He led the contingent of the Pelasgians during the Trojan War, along with his brother Pylaeus, and was killed by Ajax during the fight over the body of Patroclus.

Notes

References 

 Apollodorus, The Library with an English Translation by Sir James George Frazer, F.B.A., F.R.S. in 2 Volumes, Cambridge, MA, Harvard University Press; London, William Heinemann Ltd. 1921. ISBN 0-674-99135-4. Online version at the Perseus Digital Library. Greek text available from the same website.
Dionysus of Halicarnassus, Roman Antiquities. English translation by Earnest Cary in the Loeb Classical Library, 7 volumes. Harvard University Press, 1937–1950. Online version at Bill Thayer's Web Site
 Dionysius of Halicarnassus, Antiquitatum Romanarum quae supersunt, Vol I-IV. . Karl Jacoby. In Aedibus B.G. Teubneri. Leipzig. 1885. Greek text available at the Perseus Digital Library.
 Gaius Julius Hyginus, Fabulae from The Myths of Hyginus translated and edited by Mary Grant. University of Kansas Publications in Humanistic Studies. Online version at the Topos Text Project.
 Homer, The Iliad with an English Translation by A.T. Murray, Ph.D. in two volumes. Cambridge, MA., Harvard University Press; London, William Heinemann, Ltd. 1924. . Online version at the Perseus Digital Library.
Homer, Homeri Opera in five volumes. Oxford, Oxford University Press. 1920. . Greek text available at the Perseus Digital Library.
Tzetzes, John, Book of Histories, Book VII-VIII translated by Vasiliki Dogani from the original Greek of T. Kiessling's edition of 1826. Online version at theio.com

Sons of Aegyptus
Children of Poseidon
Children of Priam
Trojans
Princes in Greek mythology
Mythological kings of Arcadia
Kings in Greek mythology
Arcadian mythology
Pelasgians